George Herbert Hutson (born July 17, 1949 in Savannah, Georgia) is former Major League Baseball pitcher.

External links

1949 births
Living people
Baseball players from Savannah, Georgia
Chicago Cubs players
Georgia Southern Eagles baseball players
Asheville Orioles players
Bluefield Orioles players
Diablos Rojos del México players
American expatriate baseball players in Mexico
Miami Orioles players
Rochester Red Wings players
Wichita Aeros players